Non-military armoured vehicles (or paramilitary armoured vehicles if used by a paramilitary) are armoured vehicles used outside professional armed forces. While primarily invented and used for defense/internal conflicts from an equally well armed organized force, armour technology has found a number of other uses outside of this military context.

Internal security forces

Several sovereign states employ a standing security force, akin to a military force but separate from the official military. These official forces are often equipped with armoured cars, although often fitted with less lethal armaments, such as water cannon.

In countries that employ a territorial reserve force, only mobilized in times of war for civil defense, these forces may also be equipped with armoured cars. As the main heavy armaments may be out of the country or with the main army, the civil defense force may only have these military specification armoured cars as their best defense.

In France the paramilitary National Gendarmerie is amongst other vehicles equipped with 70 Berliets.

The United Kingdom police, particularly the Police Service of Northern Ireland (PSNI), has a great number of police role armoured vehicles based upon a range of base platforms including the Land Rover Defender and the OVIK Crossway. The internal security situation in Northern Ireland demands that the police operate up to 450 armoured vehicles which are optimised for public order duties.  The PSNI uses OVIK PANGOLIN armoured public order vehicles.

Rebel forces

In times of civil war or rebellion, factions or opposition groups without sufficient access to military armour, may convert civilian vehicles into fighting vehicles, adding improvised vehicle armour.

Mexican drug cartels used armed trucks with improvised vehicle armour to fight both law enforcement and rival cartels called narco tanks or Monstrou.

Construction equipment
Bulldozers, excavators, and other equipment is sometimes armoured to protect operators from debris.

Fire engines
Fire engines used in HAZMAT and airport firefighting are sometimes armoured to protect firefighters from explosions.

Emergency services

Several domestic police forces possess armoured vehicles. These may exist as part of specific response units, such as SWAT. Other forces in specific trouble spots, such as apartheid South Africa, or Northern Ireland at the height of The Troubles, may routinely patrol in armoured vehicles.

In Israel, the Emergency medical services also have armoured ambulances for the protection of patients and crew.

In Germany, the Sonderwagen or Specialwagon is used for riot-control. An armoured 6x6 vehicle, the Sonderwagen emblazoned with POLIZEI demonstrates the additional paramilitary capability of the Bundespolizei, which has arrest powers like the U.S. FBI but paramilitary capability like the U.S. National Guard.

Prisoner transport

Lightly armoured vans and buses may also be used as Prisoner transport vehicles, as protection against attempts to break the prisoners out of custody.

Buses

In some cases, buses may also be fitted with armour. These can also be used by the regular military, but are still serving their main purpose of transporting people.

Valuables

Armoured cars often find use in transporting valuable commodities, usually currency, in order to provide a defence against robbery.

VIP transport

Several VIPs such as businessmen, politicians and diplomats may choose to be transported, or provided with an armoured passenger car, as a protection against kidnap or assassination.

Tornado chasing

In the field of tornado study, a vehicle has been specially modified to be able to drive into the heart of tornados to take measurements while protecting the occupants from debris.

Gallery

References

Armoured cars
Paramilitary vehicles